{{Infobox television
| image                = Karrle Tu Bhi Mohabbat title.jpg
| caption              = Cover photo of Karrle Tu Bhi Mohabbat
| genre                = Drama
| creator              = Ekta Kapoor
| based_on             =
| developer            = Ekta Kapoor
| writer               = Reshu Nath
| director             = Muzammil Desai
| creative_director    = Prashant Bhatt'
Sonalika Bhonsle
Creative HeadAseem Kalra
| starring             = Ram KapoorSakshi Tanwar
| theme_music_composer = Pritam Chakraborty
| opentheme            = Karrle Tu Bhi Mohabbat
| endtheme             = 
| composer             = Binod Ghimile
| country              = India
| language             = Hindi
| num_seasons          = 3
| num_episodes         = 42
| list_episodes        = 
| executive_producer   = 
| producer             = Ekta KapoorShobha Kapoor
| location             = Mumbai, Maharashtra India
| cinematography       = 
| editor               = Vikas SharmaVishal SharmaSandip Bhatt
| camera               = Multi-camera
| runtime              = 19-25 minutes
| company              = Balaji Telefilms
| distributor          = ALT Digital Entertainment Limited  ZEE5
| network              = ALT Balaji  ZEE5
| picture_format       = HDTV 1080i
| audio_format         = Dolby Digital
| released             =  
}}Karrle Tu Bhi Mohabbat''' is a Hindi web series created and produced by Ekta Kapoor for her video on demand platform ALTBalaji & ZEE5. It stars Ram Kapoor and Sakshi Tanwar. The series is about two opposite people falling in love with each other.

The series is available for streaming on the ALT Balaji App and its associated websites since its release date.

The series was launched on Zee TV on 25 March 2020 as a substitute to the Zee TV shows whose broadcast had to be stopped by the channel due to COVID-19 pandemic.

Series overview

Plot
Karan Khanna (Ram Kapoor) is a superstar and recovering alcoholic who takes a detox trip to Mahabaleshwar with his new counselor Dr. Tripurasundari Nagrajan (Tipsy/Tanpura/Tirumalai Express/Nagarjuna) (Sakshi Tanwar), who he dislikes because of her strictness. The story takes a turn when he attends his estranged daughter's wedding and discovers that opposites can truly attract. The show explores how romance blossoms between the distinctly different personalities of Karan and Tipsy.

Cast
Main
 Ram Kapoor as Karan "KK" Khanna; A superstar, Radhika's ex-husband, Tipsy's husband, Trisha and Piya's biological father.
 Sakshi Tanwar as Dr. Tripurasundari "Tipsy" Nagrajan: A de-addiction therapist, Karan's wife, Piya's mother.
 Arshia Verma as Piya Nagrajan: Tipsy and Karan's daughter, Ved's adoptive daughter.
 Shweta Kawatra as Radhika Awasthi: Karan's ex-wife.
 Sanyukta Timsina as Trisha Awasthi: Radhika and Karan's daughter, Prabuddha's adoptive daughter.
 Sameer Kochhar as Palash Arora: Tipsy's ex-boyfriend.
 Hiten Tejwani as Ved Saxena: Tipsy's friend/lover, a lawyer.
 Karishma Tanna as Zoya Hussain: Karan's business partner and friend, a producer.

Recurring
 Tanvi Vyas as Sherry : Tipsy's maternal cousin, Vishal's wife.
 Kavi Shastri / Puneet Tejwani as Vishal : Karan's best friend, Sherry's husband.
 Farida Patel Venkat as Venkateshwari Nagrajan alias "Amma" : Tipsy's mother, Sherry's maternal aunt.
 Faezeh Jalali as Romila Chhetri : Karan's obsessive fan with mental issues and the occasional comic relief.
 Vikram Kapadiya as Prabuddha Kohli : Radhika's second husband, Trisha's adoptive father (Deceased).
 Dishank Arora / Rohan Gandotra as Rohan Patel : Trisha's love interest.
 Vatsal Seth as Aryan Khan : A lead actor, Karan's professional rival.
 Iris Maity as Sanam Mehta

List of episodes

Reception
Bollywoodlife reviewed the show 4.5/5 and stated, "Karrle Tu Bhi Mohabbat is a love story of two middle-aged people who eventually fall in love with each other and make each other better human beings. Though it starts off on a dry note, the show gets more interesting with Ram Kapoor’s witty lines. You’ll get nostalgic seeing these two back onscreen with each other and will definitely want to watch their love grow. Ram and Sakshi’s chemistry is worth a watch and their equation with each other in the series will surely teach you a thing or two about relationships and how imperfectly perfectly two people can be for each other."

Bollywoodgram gave 4.5/5 stars and stated "The story is fast paced and there are no low points in the show, except one maybe. The awards show in the first episode seems pretty fabricated and causes one to lose connect with an otherwise engaging series. Both Sakshi Tanwar and Ram Kapoor easily slip into their roles and remind us of the larger than life chemistry they shared in the popular television series, Bade Achhe Lagte Hain''."

References

External links
 Watch Karrle Tu Bhi Mohabbat Season 1 on ALTBalaji
Karrle Tu Bhi Mohabbat Season 2 on ALTBalaji
Karrle Tu Bhi Mohabbat Season 3 on ALTBalaji

 Watch Karrle Tu Bhi Mohabbat on ZEE5

2017 web series debuts
Hindi-language web series
ALTBalaji original programming
Indian drama web series